Kemado Records is an American record label based in New York City founded in 2002 by Andrés Santo Domingo and Tom Clapp.

In 2006 the label released the Invaders compilation, which featured many of the label's bands alongside other hard rock and heavy metal bands such as Witchcraft, High on Fire and Witch.

In 2008, Kemado introduced its Mexican Summer imprint. The label focuses on digital and limited-edition vinyl releases.  Then in October 2009 Kemado Records and Mexican Summer opened Co-Op 87, a destination brick-and-mortar record store in Greenpoint, Brooklyn with several other record labels, an idea label owner Andrés Santo Domingo called a "vinyl co-op store."  They also opened Gary's Electric Studio, a commercial recording space, at the same location.

In 2011, Mexican Summer and Kemado Records introduced a new subsidiary label called Software Recording Co.  It is run by Daniel Lopatin, who records under the name Oneohtrix Point Never and whose collaborative album with Joel Ford, Channel Pressure, served as the label's inaugural release.  Software Recording Co. focuses mostly on experimental electronic and dance music.

One of Kemado's biggest successes was 2006's release of Age of Winters by The Sword, which has sold over 80,000 copies.

Artists and releases
Audionom
Cheeseburger
Children
Danava
Diamond Nights
Dungen
Electric Voyage
Elefant
EYE
Farmer Dave Scher
Futur Skullz
Grails
Langhorne Slim
Lansing-Dreiden
Marissa Nadler
Moab
O'Death
Priestbird
Saviours
Slices
Spiders
The Fever
The Soft Pack
The Sword
TK Webb & The Visions
True Widow
Turzi
VietNam
Wild Hunt
Xasthur
Zond

Compilations
Invaders
Voyage: Facing the History of French Modern Psychedelic Music
Shout!: The Revolution Rave-Up Alive 1997–2003

Executives
 Thomas Clapp—Managing Director and Co-Founder
 Andrés Santo Domingo—President and Co-Founder
 Keith Abrahamsson—Head of A&R
 Warren Konigsmark- General Manager

References

External links
Official website
Mexican Summer
Software

See also
List of record labels

American independent record labels
Indie rock record labels